Gerrit Lucasz van Schagen or Schaagen (Latinised Gerardus a Schagen) (ca. 1642 –  was an engraver and cartographer from Amsterdam, known for his exquisite reproductions of maps, particularly of those by Nicolaes Visscher I and Frederick de Wit. He lived and worked in Amsterdam, on the Haarlemmerdijk near the New Haarlem sluice at the house with the sign "In de Stuurman". 

The surname suggests that Gerrit or his father Lucas may have been born in Schagen. On 24 April 1677 he married Gertruij Govers van Schendel/Schijndel. At this occasion he was "from Amsterdam, plaetsnijder (engraver) from profession, 35 years old, and living on the Haarlemmerdijk." After the death of Geertruij in September 1690, Gerrit, as widower of Geertruij and still living on the Haarlemmerdijk, remarried on 7 October 1695 with the 34-year old Anna Cornelis. Gerrit and Anna baptized children between 1697 and 1701 and together were witnesses at other baptisms as late as June 1712. A Gerrit van Schagen was buried 19 March 1724 at the Karthuizer cemetery in Amsterdam.

References

 

1640s births
1724 deaths
Year of death unknown
17th-century Dutch cartographers
Engravers from Amsterdam
Cartographers